David Matthew Macfadyen (born 17 October 1974) is an English actor. Known for his performances on stage and screen, he gained prominence for his role as Mr. Darcy in Joe Wright's Pride & Prejudice (2005). He currently stars as Tom Wambsgans in the HBO drama series Succession (2018–present), for which he has received a Primetime Emmy Award, two BAFTA Awards, and a Screen Actors Guild Award.

Macfadyen is also known for his roles in films such as Death at a Funeral (2007), Frost/Nixon (2008), Anna Karenina (2012), The Assistant (2019), and Operation Mincemeat (2021). He made his television debut in 1998 as Hareton Earnshaw in Wuthering Heights. He portrayed Tom Quinn in the BBC One spy series Spooks (2002–04, 2011), and Inspector Edmund Reid in the BBC mystery series Ripper Street (2012–2016). He also starred as Henry Wilcox in Kenneth Lonergan's miniseries Howards End and Charles Ingram in the Stephen Frears' limited series Quiz (2020).

Early life

Macfadyen was born in Great Yarmouth, Norfolk, the son of Meinir (née Owen), a drama teacher and former actress, and Martin Macfadyen, an oil engineer. His paternal grandparents were Scottish and his maternal grandparents were Welsh. Macfadyen was brought up in a number of places, including Jakarta, Indonesia, as a result of his father's occupation. He attended schools in England (including in Louth, Lincolnshire), Scotland and Indonesia, and went to Oakham School in Rutland, before being accepted to the Royal Academy of Dramatic Art at 17. As a student, he was inspired by Ingmar Bergman's Fanny and Alexander, which he thought was "[a]n example to follow – an example of people acting with each other...", and "[f]eatured just the most extraordinary acting I'd ever seen".

Career

After having studied at the RADA from 1992 to 1995, Macfadyen became known in British theatre primarily for his work with the stage company Cheek by Jowl, for which he played Antonio in The Duchess of Malfi, Charles Surface in The School for Scandal, and Benedick in Much Ado About Nothing. His Benedick was played as an officer-class buffoon with a moustache and a braying laugh. In 2005, he played Prince Hal in Henry IV, Parts One and Two at the Royal National Theatre, with Michael Gambon in the role of Falstaff. In 2007, he returned to the stage, portraying an American, Clay, a stay-at-home father with a liberal attitude in the play The Pain and the Itch.

A TV breakthrough came when he appeared as Hareton Earnshaw in an adaptation of Wuthering Heights, screened on the ITV network in 1998. Further television drama work followed, including starring roles in the dramas Warriors (1999) and The Way We Live Now (2001), both for the BBC. Also in 2001, he earned acclaim for his starring role in the BBC Two drama serial Perfect Strangers, which was written and directed by Stephen Poliakoff. In 2002, he starred in The Project, a BBC drama charting New Labour's rise to power. He starred in Spooks, which became a success when screened on BBC One. A longer second season was screened in 2003, and a third season was broadcast in autumn 2004, with him leaving the series in the second episode. The series was aired as MI-5 on the A&E Network. In 2007 he appeared in the one-off Channel 4 drama Secret Life, which dealt with paedophilia. Macfadyen won the Best Actor award at the Royal Television Society 2007 Awards for this part, and was nominated for a BAFTA. He also appeared in a short sketch for Comic Relief as the bridegroom in Mr. Bean's Wedding, alongside Rowan Atkinson and Michelle Ryan.

Macfadyen appeared in films including Enigma (released in 2001), and In My Father's Den, for which he received the New Zealand Screen Award for Best Actor. He starred as the romantic lead Fitzwilliam Darcy in an adaptation of Pride and Prejudice, released in the UK in September 2005.

Macfadyen starred in Frank Oz's Death at a Funeral and the film Incendiary, based on Chris Cleave's novel alongside Michelle Williams and Ewan McGregor. He also appeared in Ron Howard's film Frost/Nixon, in which he played John Birt. In 2008, he played the male lead Arthur Clennam in the BBC adaptation of Charles Dickens' Little Dorrit. In 2009 Macfadyen appeared alongside Academy Award-nominated actress Helena Bonham Carter in the BBC Four movie Enid, based on the life of Enid Blyton, as Hugh Pollock, Blyton's publisher and first husband.

In 2010, he played the Sheriff of Nottingham in Robin Hood. He starred as Prior Philip in the TV serial The Pillars of the Earth, and was the middle-aged Logan Mountstuart in Any Human Heart. In June 2010, Macfadyen won a British Academy Television Award for Best Supporting Actor for his work in Criminal Justice.

In 2011, Macfadyen made a final cameo in the BBC show Spooks, and in 2012, he played Oblonsky in Joe Wright's film, Anna Karenina. In December 2012 he began portraying Detective Inspector Edmund Reid in BBC One's Ripper Street.

In 2013-14 he played Jeeves in the production of Jeeves and Wooster in Perfect Nonsense at the Duke of York's Theatre in the West End of London. The play won the 2014 Olivier award for Best New Comedy.

In 2015 Amazon Prime picked up Ripper Street and, after good reviews, it was recommissioned for fourth and fifth seasons. Macfadyen said he was "delighted to be embarking on another dose of Ripper Streetblood and guts, pocket watches and Victorian headgear, wonderfully dark, moving and mysterious story lines from Mr Richard Wardlow". The series also aired in the U.S. on BBC America. Also in 2015, he guest starred in the pilot episode of The Last Kingdom.

He currently stars as Tom Wambsgans in the HBO series Succession, for which he has received two Primetime Emmy Award nominations, and in 2022, a Primetime Emmy Award win for Outstanding Supporting Actor in a Drama Series.

In 2020, he appeared in the role of Major Charles Ingram in a three-part ITV drama, Quiz, based on the controversial coughing cheat scandal on Who Wants to Be a Millionaire? in 2001.

Personal life

In 2002, Macfadyen began a relationship with his Spooks co-star Keeley Hawes. They were married in November 2004. The couple have two children. Macfadyen is stepfather to Hawes's son from her previous marriage. The couple are patrons of the Lace Market Theatre in Nottingham.

Filmography

Film

Television

Radio

Documentary

Theatre

Awards and nominations

References

External links

BBC Drama Faces: Matthew Macfadyen

1974 births
20th-century English male actors
21st-century English male actors
Actors from Norfolk 
Alumni of RADA
Best Supporting Actor BAFTA Award (television) winners
English male film actors
English people of Scottish descent
English people of Welsh descent
English male stage actors
English male Shakespearean actors
English male television actors
Living people
Outstanding Performance by a Supporting Actor in a Drama Series Primetime Emmy Award winners
People educated at Oakham School
People from Great Yarmouth
Royal Shakespeare Company members